"Boxers" is a song by Morrissey, released in January 1995 to promote a tour of the same name.

The single reached number 23 in the UK Singles Chart, despite not featuring on an album at the time of the release. The title track and the two B-sides would later be compiled on the World of Morrissey that was released in February that year.

Track listings

7" vinyl and cassette
 "Boxers"
 "Have-a-Go Merchant"

12" vinyl and CD
 "Boxers"
 "Have-a-Go Merchant"
 "Whatever Happens, I Love You"

Reviews
The single was given a favourable review in Q magazine, with Ian Harrison writing that the song "is as good as anything he's done" and that the single made you "realise how few singers can leave you as despondent, elated or intrigued". NME gave it a negative review, with John Mulvey declaring the single was "just another example of his tedious obsession with bits of rough who'd give him a kicking given half a chance" and that "any enjoyment of his records nowadays is tainted by the fact that a nasty taste from all those obnoxious, apologist, quasi-libertarian quotes still lingers."

In his review for AllMusic Ned Raggett found the song to be "a fine enough number, with a good overall performance and production to recommend it."

Musicians
 Morrissey: vocals
 Alain Whyte: guitar
 Boz Boorer: guitar, sax, clarinet
 Jonny Bridgwood: bass guitar
 Woodie Taylor: drums

Live performances
The song was performed live by Morrissey on his 1995 and 2000 tours.

References

Morrissey songs
1995 singles
Songs written by Morrissey
Songs written by Alain Whyte
1995 songs
Parlophone singles